Jack Jones (20 July 1887 – 19 May 1964) was an Australian rules footballer who played with South Melbourne in the Victorian Football League (VFL).

Notes

External links 

1887 births
1964 deaths
Australian rules footballers from Victoria (Australia)
Sydney Swans players